Rihards Butkus (born 25 August 1972) is a retired Latvian football defender.

References

1972 births
Living people
Latvian footballers
FK Rīga players
Valmieras FK players
Association football defenders
Latvia international footballers